The Dendrocerotaceae is the only family of hornworts in the order Dendrocerotales.

Phylogeny
Currently phylogeny.

References

External links

Hornworts
Hornwort families